Gregory Enelada (born 1 December 1989 in France is a professional footballer who plays as a midfielder internationally for Martinique.

He was part of the Martinique squad for the 2019 CONCACAF Gold Cup.

References

1989 births
Living people
Martiniquais footballers
Martinique international footballers
Association football forwards
2019 CONCACAF Gold Cup players